The 1905–06 season was Burslem Port Vale's eighth consecutive season (12th overall) of football in the English Football League. It was another season spent struggling at the lower end of the league.

On the pitch the team allowed goals and narrowly avoided the re-election zone. A poor season on the pitch was more than matched by a hopeless financial season off the pitch, with low attendance figures suggesting that the club could not sustain league football for much longer.

Overview

Second Division
An expanded league saw an extra four new clubs added to the division, in addition to the replacement for Doncaster Rovers, who failed to gain re-election the previous season. This put the Vale up against Chelsea, Hull City, Leeds City, and Clapton Orient for the first time.

The first five games of the season saw a tally of just three points collected, with fourteen goals conceded. This was followed by four wins in five as the club surged up the league, this run included a 3–2 win over high-flying Chelsea, where an impressive 6,000 fans turned up. Another barren spell followed, with just one point gained in the following nine games – in six of these the "Valeites" failed to score. A rare win came on 30 December, with Harry Mountford scoring a hat-trick past Lincoln City – the first hat-trick a Vale player had scored in close to three years. However the side then proceeded to lose all their matches in January. The last three months saw a revival, and the club managed to win six of their last fifteen games.

The Vale finished just outside the re-election zone on goal average, if the ranking was based on goal difference then they would have finished below Chesterfield. Vale lost seventeen of their nineteen away games, never drawing a match away from home, and conceded more on their travels than any other side in the league. Overall the defence was the leakiest in the division, conceding 82 goals in 38 games.

Harry Mountford was the club's top scorer with 15 goals, with Robert Carter, Philip Smith, George Price also contributing significantly to the scoring tally. Carter and Arthur Box missed just three matches; Mountford, Price, James Hamilton, and William Cope also hardly missed a game.

Finances
The financial outlook was bleak, poor runs of results saw already low attendance figures plummet. The club's directors therefore took the decision to sell right-half Harry Croxton and inspirational striker Adrian Capes to Stoke in November 1905. There were rumours of the club winding up at the end of the season, though the club would continue in its current form for one more season. Despite selling players and spending frugally the club lost a whopping £450, with gate receipts falling by £280 on the previous campaign. Sam Gleaves warned that if supporters failed to turn up for matches then the club would "inevitably cease to exist".

Cup competitions
In the FA Cup, Vale defeated amateur club Oxford City after Oxford failed to make the most of their shooting chances; the Second Round saw Vale eliminated by Gainsborough Trinity at home, despite having organized special training sessions beforehand. In the County cups, Vale knocked out local rivals Stoke (Reserves) at home by 5–0 and 3–0 scorelines, before receiving 7–0 and 5–1 thumpings at Birmingham and Burton United respectively at the semi-final stages.

League table

Results

Burslem Port Vale's score comes first

Football League Second Division

Results by matchday

Matches

FA Cup

Birmingham Senior Cup

Staffordshire Senior Cup

Player statistics

Appearances

Top scorers

Transfers

Transfers in

Transfers out

References
Specific

General

Port Vale F.C. seasons
Burslem Port Vale